Kopytnik  is a village in the administrative district of Gmina Łomazy, within Biała Podlaska County, Lublin Voivodeship, in eastern Poland.

See also
List of cities and towns in Poland

References

Villages in Biała Podlaska County